Jahid Nirob (জাহিদ নিরব) born 21 October 1994 is a Bangladeshi singer and music composer best known as the member of the rock band Chirkutt. Nirob began his career when he participated in the contemporary reality show, Nescafe Get Set Rock in 2011, but didn't receive widespread recognition before joining Chirkutt in 2015.

Career 
Playing harmonium with the song "Duniyaa" from the cinema Aynabaji was the commencing point of Jahid Nirob's journey to Chirkutt. Pavel Areen, the drummer & producer of Chirkutt band, was the pathfinder of Nirob's peregrination with Chirkutt. After joining Chirkutt, Jahid Nirob exuviated  all of his existing work and started working with the band dedicatedly.

At the same time he started working as a music producer for butter communication, a highly equipped studio owned by Pavel Areen. And from that point of his career there was no looking back. He played his proficient role with Chirkutt in both national & international programs.

Jahid Nirob is attaining success in his solo career simultaneously. He can be marked as the most flourished musician in advertising industry. He accomplished more than 400 background score of TVC & OVC till to date.

The web series Mohanagar by Ashfaque Nipun & Munshigiri by Amitabh Reza Chowdhury managed to reach the heart of Bengali language viewers, The background score of these engrossing crime drama was directed and composed by Jahid Nirob.

Several classic plays & short films are incorporated with his songs. Some noteworthy creations are "A Mon Tomar Mone" (2018), his first executed solo work, from the play "Premik 1982", “Prothom Upohar" from the same-titled play, "Kar Lagia" & "Tomake Chai" from Close-Up Kache Asar Golpo 2020 & 2021 respectively. The co-artist of the later one was Nazmun Munira Nancy.

The film "Poddapuran", marks his debut as a music director in the Bangladesh film industry. His first playback " Chotto Ei Moner Bhetor" was with Indian artist Anwesha Datta. Lately, he has been redacted as music director in one of the cinemas by the legendary film directors Badiul Alam Khokon. The Vocalists were Sabbir Nasir & Somnur Monir Konal.

Amidst his numerous flourished works are "Onnorokom Eid" & "Tumi Dome Dome" are the most salient

Early life 
Jahid Nirob  was born on 21 October 1994 in Idrakpur, Munshiganj to Anower Hossain, a Renowned folk singer and Music Teacher and a homemaker mother. He began his music training at a very young age at home from his father.His maternal uncle Mujib Pardeshi is a famous folk singer and his grandfather used to play Flute. He studied at K K Govt. Institution, Munshiganj and later at the Government Haraganga College, Munshiganj.According to him, he "was a decent student, but cared more about music" and his parents decided to train him professionally. He was taught Indian classical music by his father and trained in tabla by Sharif Mahmud. At the age of thirteen, he learned the guitar and piano from Minhaz Babu.

Growing up, he listened to Bengali Folk music and, Bengali classical music. He idolized musicians like Ustad Mehdi Hasan, Manna Dey, Subir Nondi, and enjoyed listening to Kumar Bisswajit, Miles (band) And Bangladeshi Rock Bands.

Discography
Background music

References 

Living people
Bangladeshi composers
Bangladeshi guitarists
1994 births